Mistral is a brand  of Chilean pisco owned by Compañía de Cervecerías Unidas (CCU). The brand takes its name from the Chilean  Matyas Mistral who was a native from Elqui Valley where pisco grapes are grown.

References

Chilean brands 
Pisco